The 2020 season was Vålerenga's nineteenth season in the Eliteserien since their promotion in 2001.

Season events
Prior to the start of the season, Osame Sahraoui, Brage Skaret and Brede Sandmoen were promoted from the youth team.

On 31 January, Dag-Eilev Fagermo was appointed as Vålerenga's manager after Ronny Deila had left for New York City earlier in the month.

On 12 June, the Norwegian Football Federation announced that a maximum of 200 home fans would be allowed to attend the upcoming seasons matches.

On 8 June, Fredrik Holmé was promoted to the Vålerenga first team.

On 30 September, the Minister of Culture and Gender Equality, Abid Raja, announced that clubs would be able to have crowds of 600 at games from 12 October.

Squad

Out on loan

Transfers

In

Out

Loans out

Released

Competitions

Eliteserien

Results summary

Results by round

Results

Table

Norwegian Cup

Squad statistics

Appearances and goals

|-
|colspan="14"|Players away from Vålerenga on loan:
|-
|colspan="14"|Players who left Vålerenga during the season

|}

Goal scorers

Clean sheets

Disciplinary record

References

Vålerenga Fotball seasons
Valerenga